Rachid Hamdani (born 8 April 1985) is a footballer who last played as a midfielder for Asteras Tripoli. Born in France, he represented Morocco at international level.

Club career
Hamdani started his career in France playing mainly with two clubs: Nancy and  Clermont, till the summer of 2011.

He joined Apollon Limassol in 2011 where he won the 2012–13 Cypriot Cup. After making fewer appearances with other players like Camel Meriem and Luka Stojanovic being preferred, he scored in his last game for Apollon Limassol in the 2014–15 season.

On 17 June 2015, he signed a two-year contract with Greek Super League side Asteras Tripoli.

Honours
 Ligue 2: 2005
 Coupe de la Ligue: 2006
 Cypriot Cup: 2012–13

References

External links
 

1985 births
Living people
People from Toul
Sportspeople from Meurthe-et-Moselle
Association football midfielders
French sportspeople of Moroccan descent
French footballers
Moroccan footballers
Moroccan expatriate footballers
Morocco international footballers
Ligue 1 players
Ligue 2 players
Cypriot First Division players
Super League Greece players
AS Nancy Lorraine players
Clermont Foot players
Apollon Limassol FC players
Asteras Tripolis F.C. players
Expatriate footballers in Cyprus
Expatriate footballers in Greece
Moroccan expatriate sportspeople in Cyprus
Moroccan expatriate sportspeople in Greece
French expatriate footballers
French expatriate sportspeople in Cyprus
French expatriate sportspeople in Greece
Footballers from Grand Est